Berat is a masculine given name, used among Albanians or Turks. People named Berat include:

 Berat Albayrak, Former Turkish Minister of Economy
 Berat Kısal, Turkish volleyball player
 Berat Hyseni, Kosovar footballer
 Berat Sadik, Finnish footballer

Turkish masculine given names
Albanian masculine given names